Kendall Grove (born November 12, 1982) is an American mixed martial artist who is currently signed to Bare Knuckle Fighting Championship. A professional competitor since 2003, he has also competed for the Bellator MMA, UFC, KSW, ProElite, King of the Cage, and was the winner of The Ultimate Fighter 3 on Spike TV.

Early life
Grove was born in Wailuku, Maui, Hawaii and is a graduate of Baldwin High School in Wailuku, Hawaii, where he was a high school wrestler and played football. Grove has a mixed ethnic heritage of Native Hawaiian, Samoan, Spanish, and Native American bloodlines. Kendall trained Brazilian jiu-jitsu in his freshman year in the high school and moved to Las Vegas in 2002 to focus in the sport. However, he got intrigued in mixed martial arts and begun training all aspects of it.

Mixed martial arts career

The Ultimate Fighter
While on The Ultimate Fighter 3, Grove trained under Tito Ortiz, and won a preliminary victory against Ross Pointon by rear naked choke and in the semi-finals defeated Kalib Starnes by submission after a rib injury sustained by Starnes during the fight caused him to verbally submit. He defeated Ed Herman in the finals by unanimous decision (29–28, 29–28, and 29–28) in the series finale, winning a six-figure contract with the Ultimate Fighting Championship.

Ultimate Fighting Championship
In his first bout since the show on October 10, 2006, Grove defeated then-undefeated Chris Price via submission (elbows) in the first round at Ortiz vs. Shamrock 3: The Final Chapter.

After the taping of the series, Grove was invited to Ortiz's training camp, Team Punishment and has trained with Ortiz along with many of his former teammates on The Ultimate Fighter 3 at Ortiz's Big Bear City, California training facility. He has trained with Randy Couture's camp at Xtreme Couture. Since his loss to Jorge Rivera, he has moved back to Hawaii and has trained there with his friend BJ Penn.

In his next fight at UFC 69 he faced up and coming prospect Alan Belcher. After a close first round Grove came out strong in round two. Grove rocked Belcher with punches and knees from the clinch. With just over two minutes remaining in the round Grove secured a double-leg takedown. As Belcher scrambled to escape Grove locked in a D'Arce choke which rendered Belcher unconscious giving Grove the victory by technical submission at 4:42 of round two.

At UFC 74, Grove faced UFC veteran Patrick Côté. Côté defeated Grove via first-round TKO. Grove experienced his second consecutive loss at UFC 80 to Jorge Rivera losing by KO at 1:20 in the first round.

Grove faced Evan Tanner at The Ultimate Fighter: Team Rampage vs Team Forrest Finale on June 21, 2008. The bout saw Grove bloody Tanner and frustrate the former middleweight champion by stopping his takedowns and getting back up immediately following being sent to the floor. Grove won a split decision (28–29, 30–26, and 30–26) to snap his two fight losing streak.

Grove then defeated Jason Day by TKO at UFC 96. In his next appearance at UFC 101, Grove lost to Ricardo Almeida by unanimous decision.

At UFC 106 Grove defeated Jake Rosholt by triangle choke at 3:59 of the first round.

Grove next faced middleweight prospect Mark Muñoz at UFC 112 in a bout that would earn Fight of the Night honors.  After a successful first round with several near submissions, Grove lost via TKO at 2:50 in the 2nd round.

Grove faced Goran Reljic on July 3, 2010, at UFC 116. Grove won via split decision (28–29, 30–27, and 29–28).

Grove next fought Demian Maia on December 4, 2010, at The Ultimate Fighter: Team GSP vs. Team Koscheck Finale. Grove lost the fight via unanimous decision (29–28, 29–28, and 29–28).

Grove faced Tim Boetsch on May 28, 2011, at UFC 130 and lost via unanimous decision.

On June 17, 2011, Grove announced via Facebook that he had been released from the UFC, along with welterweight Chuck O'Neil. He became the third Ultimate Fighter winner to be released following Efrain Escudero from Season Eight and Travis Lutter from Season Four.

ProElite
Grove fought Joe Riggs at ProElite 1 This was a rematch of their previous encounter at Rumble on the Rock 5, a match which Riggs won. Grove won via guillotine choke submission 59 seconds into round 1.

Grove fought Ikuhisa Minowa at ProElite 3 on January 21, 2012. He won the fight by unanimous decision.

Independent Promotions
Grove headlined against Jay Silva on February 16 in Las Vegas, Nevada. Grove lost the fight via submission in the second round.

Grove's next fight was against undefeated Derek Brunson for the ShoFight Middleweight Championship. Grove won via split decision.

Grove next fought Ariel Gandulla in Victoria, Canada at Aggression Fighting Championship 13 on November 3, 2012. Grove defeated Gandulla by TKO in the second round.

KSW
On December 1, 2012, Grove faced Mamed Khalidov at KSW 21 event in Poland. He lost by submission in the second round.

On June 8, 2013, he fought Michał Materla, for KSW Middleweight Championship and lost by unanimous decision.

Bellator MMA
Grove made his promotional debut at Bellator 104 on October 18, 2013 with a three-round decision victory over Joe Vedepo.

In 2014, Grove entered the Bellator Season 10 Middleweight tournament.  He faced Brett Cooper at Bellator 114 on March 28, 2014. He lost the fight via knockout in the second round.

Grove faced former Bellator Light Heavyweight champion Christian M'Pumbu on October 3, 2014 at Bellator 127. He won the fight via submission in the second round.

Grove faced Brandon Halsey for the Bellator Middleweight Championship on May 15, 2015 at Bellator 137. He lost the fight via TKO in the fourth round.

Grove next faced Joey Beltran at Bellator 143 on September 25, 2015.  He won the fight via TKO in the third round.

Grove then faced Francisco France at Bellator 150 on February 26, 2016. He again won the fight via knockout, this time in the first round.

Following two knockout victories, Grove faced former Bellator middleweight champion, Alexander Shlemenko, in the main event at Bellator 162. Grove lost the fight via TKO in the second round.

Grove was originally scheduled to face Chris Honeycutt at Bellator 174 on March 3, 2017. However, Honeycutt was removed from the bout on February 28 and replaced by Mike Rhodes. Rhodes was then unable to make the required weight, and the bout scratched after they were unable to come to an agreement for the bout to proceed at a catchweight.

Grove faced John Salter at Bellator 181 on July 14, 2017. He lost the fight via technical submission in the first round.

Grove faced A.J. Matthews at Bellator 193 on January 26, 2018. He lost the fight via split decision and was subsequently released from the promotion.

Golden Boy Promotions
Grove was expected to face Andre Walker on Golden Boy Promotions' inaugural MMA event on November 24, 2018 but the fight never made it to fruition.

Other regional promotions
Grove was scheduled to face Casey Ryan at LXF 6 on March 20, 2020, but the event was cancelled due to the COVID-19 pandemic.

Ten years after their first bout with Grove lost by unanimous decision, Grove rematched Michał Materla on January 21, 2023 at KSW 78, losing the bout in the second round after being dropped and finished with ground and pound.

Bare knuckle boxing
After three straight losses in Bellator, Grove signed to a new promotion, Bare Knuckle FC and debuted on August 25, 2018. He faced Bruce Abramski and won the bout by unanimous decision.

In his sophomore bout in BKFC, Grove faced Marcel Stamps at BKFC 3 on October 20, 2018. He lost the fight via knockout.

Grove next faced fellow UFC veteran Hector Lombard at BKFC 12 on September 11, 2020. He lost the fight via knockout in the first round.

Personal life
Grove and wife Anna, have six children together: two sons and four daughters.

Championships and achievements
Ultimate Fighting Championship
The Ultimate Fighter Season 3 Tournament Winner
Fight of the Night (Two times)
Knockout of the Night (One time)
ShoFight
ShoFight Middleweight Championship (One time)

Mixed martial arts record

|-
|Loss
|align=center| 24–19 (1)
|Michał Materla
|TKO (punches)
|KSW 78
|
|align=center|2 
|align=center|4:27 
|Szczecin, Poland
|
|-
|Win
|align=center| 24–18 (1)
|Anthony Ruiz
|Submission (triangle choke)
|WFC 110
|
|align=center| 1
|align=center| 4:30
|Wailuku, Hawaii, United States
|
|-
|Loss
|align=center| 23–18 (1)
|A.J. Matthews
|Decision (split)
|Bellator 193
|
|align=center|3
|align=center|5:00
|Temecula, California, United States
|
|-
|Loss
|align=center| 23–17 (1)
|John Salter
|Technical Submission (rear-naked choke)
|Bellator 181
|
|align=center|1
|align=center|4:37
|Thackerville, Oklahoma, United States
|
|-
|Loss
|align=center| 23–16 (1)
|Alexander Shlemenko
|TKO (punches)
|Bellator 162
|
|align=center|2
|align=center|1:43
|Memphis, Tennessee, United States
|
|-
| Win
|align=center| 23–15 (1)
| Francisco France
| KO (punches)
| Bellator 150
| 
| align=center| 2
| align=center| 0:35
| Mulvane, Kansas, United States
|
|-
| Win
|align=center| 22–15 (1)
| Joey Beltran
| TKO (punches)
| Bellator 143
| 
| align=center| 3
| align=center| 2:27
| Hidalgo, Texas, United States
|
|-
| Loss
|align=center| 21–15 (1)
|Brandon Halsey
| TKO (punches)
|Bellator 137
|
|align=center| 4
|align=center| 2:25
|Temecula, California, United States
|
|-
| Win
| align=center| 21–14 (1)
| Christian M'Pumbu
| Submission (rear-naked choke)
| Bellator 127
| 
| align=center| 2
| align=center| 4:14
| Temecula, California, United States
| 
|-
| Loss
| align=center| 20–14 (1)
| Brett Cooper
| KO (punches)
| Bellator 114
| 
| align=center| 2
| align=center| 3:33
| West Valley City, Utah, United States
| 
|-
| Win
| align=center| 20–13 (1)
| Joe Vedepo
| Decision (unanimous)
| Bellator 104
| 
| align=center| 3
| align=center| 5:00
| Cedar Rapids, Iowa, United States
| 
|-
| Win
| align=center| 19–13 (1)
| Danny Mitchell
| TKO (punches)
| GWC: The British Invasion: US vs. UK
| 
| align=center| 1
| align=center| 4:53
| Kansas City, Missouri, United States
| 
|-
| Loss
| align=center| 18–13 (1)
| Michał Materla
| Decision (unanimous)
| KSW 23
| 
| align=center| 4
| align=center| 5:00
| Gdańsk, Poland
| 
|-
| Loss
| align=center| 18–12 (1)
| Jesse Taylor
| Decision (unanimous)
| K-Oz Entertainment: Bragging Rights 5
| 
| align=center| 5
| align=center| 5:00
| Perth, Western Australia
| 
|-
| Loss
| align=center| 18–11 (1)
| Mamed Khalidov
| Submission (achilles lock)
| KSW 21
| 
| align=center| 2
| align=center| 1:31
| Warsaw, Poland
| 
|-
| Win
| align=center| 18–10 (1)
| Chris Cisneros
| TKO (punches)
| RWE: Just Scrap 3
| 
| align=center| 2
| align=center| 4:30
| Maui, Hawaii, United States
| 
|-
| Win
| align=center| 17–10 (1)
| Ariel Gandulla
| TKO (punches)
| AFC 13: Natural Selection
| 
| align=center| 2
| align=center| 4:45
| Victoria, British Columbia, Canada
| 
|-
| Win
| align=center| 16–10 (1)
| Joe Cronin
| Submission (D'Arce choke)
| RWE: Just Scrap 2
| 
| align=center| 1
| align=center| 1:20
| Lahaina, Hawaii, United States
| 
|-
| Win
| align=center| 15–10 (1)
| Derek Brunson
| Decision (split)
| ShoFight 20
| 
| align=center| 3
| align=center| 5:00
| Springfield, Missouri, United States
| 
|-
| Loss
| align=center| 
| Jay Silva
| Technical Submission (arm-triangle choke)
| Superior Cage Combat 4
| 
| align=center| 2
| align=center| 1:52
| Las Vegas, Nevada, United States
| 
|-
| Win
| align=center| 14–9 (1)
| Ikuhisa Minowa
| Decision (unanimous)
| ProElite 3
| 
| align=center| 3
| align=center| 5:00
| Honolulu, Hawaii, United States
| 
|-
| Win
| align=center| 13–9 (1)
| Joe Riggs
| Submission (guillotine choke)
| ProElite: Arlovski vs. Lopez
| 
| align=center| 1
| align=center| 0:59
| Honolulu, Hawaii, United States
| 
|-
| Loss
| align=center| 12–9 (1)
| Tim Boetsch
| Decision (unanimous)
| UFC 130
| 
| align=center| 3
| align=center| 5:00
| Las Vegas, Nevada, United States
| 
|-
| Loss
| align=center| 12–8 (1)
| Demian Maia
| Decision (unanimous)
| The Ultimate Fighter: Team GSP vs. Team Koscheck Finale
| 
| align=center| 3
| align=center| 5:00
| Las Vegas, Nevada, United States
| 
|-
| Win
| align=center| 12–7 (1)
| Goran Reljic
| Decision (split)
| UFC 116
| 
| align=center| 3
| align=center| 5:00
| Las Vegas, Nevada, United States
| 
|-
| Loss
| align=center| 11–7 (1)
| Mark Muñoz
| TKO (punches)
| UFC 112
| 
| align=center| 2
| align=center| 2:50
| Abu Dhabi, United Arab Emirates
| 
|-
| Win
| align=center| 11–6 (1)
| Jake Rosholt
| Submission (triangle choke)
| UFC 106
| 
| align=center| 1
| align=center| 3:59
| Las Vegas, Nevada, United States
| 
|-
| Loss
| align=center| 10–6 (1)
| Ricardo Almeida
| Decision (unanimous)
| UFC 101
| 
| align=center| 3
| align=center| 5:00
| Philadelphia, Pennsylvania, United States
| 
|-
| Win
| align=center| 10–5 (1)
| Jason Day
| TKO (punches and elbows)
| UFC 96
| 
| align=center| 1
| align=center| 1:32
| Columbus, Ohio, United States
| 
|-
| Win
| align=center| 9–5 (1)
| Evan Tanner
| Decision (split)
| The Ultimate Fighter: Team Rampage vs Team Forrest Finale
| 
| align=center| 3
| align=center| 5:00
| Las Vegas, Nevada, United States
| 
|-
| Loss
| align=center| 8–5 (1)
| Jorge Rivera
| KO (punches)
| UFC 80
| 
| align=center| 1
| align=center| 1:20
| Newcastle upon Tyne, England
| 
|-
| Loss
| align=center| 8–4 (1)
| Patrick Côté
| TKO (punches)
| UFC 74
| 
| align=center| 1
| align=center| 4:45
| Las Vegas, Nevada, United States
| 
|-
| Win
| align=center| 8–3 (1)
| Alan Belcher
| Submission (D'Arce choke)
| UFC 69
| 
| align=center| 2
| align=center| 4:42
| Houston, Texas, United States
| 
|-
| Win
| align=center| 7–3 (1)
| Chris Price
| Submission (elbows)
| Ortiz vs. Shamrock 3: The Final Chapter
| 
| align=center| 1
| align=center| 3:59
| Hollywood, Florida, United States
| 
|-
| Win
| align=center| 6–3 (1)
| Ed Herman
| Decision (unanimous)
| The Ultimate Fighter: Team Ortiz vs. Team Shamrock Finale
| 
| align=center| 3
| align=center| 5:00
| Las Vegas, Nevada, United States
| 
|-
| Win
| align=center| 5–3 (1)
| Jay Carter
| Submission (triangle choke)
| Rumble on the Rock: Showdown in Maui
| 
| align=center| 1
| align=center| 3:25
| Maui, Hawaii, United States
| 
|-
| Loss
| align=center| 4–3 (1)
| Hector Ramirez
| KO (punch)
| KOTC: Mortal Sins
| 
| align=center| 1
| align=center| 1:08
| Primm, Nevada, United States
| 
|-
| Win
| align=center| 4–2 (1)
| Matt Gidney
| Submission (rear-naked choke)
| TC 8-Total Combat 8
| 
| align=center| 1
| align=center| 2:28
| Tijuana, Mexico
| 
|-
| Loss
| align=center| 3–2 (1)
| Savant Young
| Technical Submission (guillotine choke)
| Lockdown in Paradise 1
| 
| align=center| 1
| align=center| 2:00
| Lahaina, Hawaii, United States
| 
|-
| Win
| align=center| 3–1 (1)
| Matt Hendricks (fighter)|Matt Hendricks
| TKO (punches)
| Total Combat 7
| 
| align=center| 2
| align=center| N/A
| Tijuana, Mexico
| 
|-
| NC
| align=center| 2–1 (1)
| Ricky Gunz
| NC
| Total Combat 6
| 
| align=center| 1
| align=center| N/A
| Tijuana, Mexico
| 
|-
| Loss
| align=center| 2–1
| Joe Riggs
| KO (elbows)
| Rumble on the Rock 5
| 
| align=center| 1
| align=center| 3:09
| Honolulu, Hawaii, United States
| 
|-
| Win
| align=center| 2–0
| Kaipo Kalama
| Submission (rear-naked choke)
| SuperBrawl 34
| 
| align=center| 2
| align=center| 3:16
| Wailuku, Hawaii, United States
| 
|-
| Win
| align=center| 1–0
| Tripstin Kersiano
| Submission (triangle choke)
| KFC 3: Island Pride
| 
| align=center| 1
| align=center| 2:04
| Wailuku, Hawaii, United States
|

Mixed martial arts exhibition match record

Bare knuckle record

|-
|Loss
|align=center|1–2
|Hector Lombard
|TKO (punch)
|BKFC 12
|
|align=center|1
|align=center|1:50
|Daytona Beach, Florida, United States
|
|-
|Loss
|align=center|1–1
|Marcel Stamps
|KO (punches)
|BKFC 3: The Takeover
|
|align=center|3
|align=center|0:47
|Biloxi, Mississippi, United States
|
|- 
|Win
|align=center|1–0
|Bruce Abramski 
|Decision (unanimous)
|BKFC 2: A New Era
|
|align=center|5
|align=center|2:00
|Biloxi, Mississippi, United States
|
|-

See also
 List of Bellator MMA alumni

References

External links
 
 
 

The Ultimate Fighter winners
1982 births
American male mixed martial artists
Middleweight mixed martial artists
Mixed martial artists from Hawaii
Samoan male mixed martial artists
Living people
People from Maui
Light heavyweight mixed martial artists
Mixed martial artists utilizing boxing
Mixed martial artists utilizing Brazilian jiu-jitsu
American practitioners of Brazilian jiu-jitsu
Samoan practitioners of Brazilian jiu-jitsu
People awarded a black belt in Brazilian jiu-jitsu
Bare-knuckle boxers
American sportspeople of Samoan descent
American people of Spanish descent
American people of Native Hawaiian descent
Native American sportspeople
Ultimate Fighting Championship male fighters